Lake Wicwas, also known as Wickwas Lake, is a  water body in the Lakes Region of central New Hampshire, United States, in the town of Meredith. Water from Lake Wicwas flows south to Lake Winnisquam, then to the Winnipesaukee River, and ultimately to the Merrimack River.

The lake is classified as a warm-water fishery, with observed species including smallmouth and largemouth bass, chain pickerel, horned pout, and black crappie.

Longstanding disagreement about how to spell the name of the lake led locals in 2019 to request that the state officially designate it as "Wicwas" without a K. The requested spelling was adopted by the U.S. Board on Geographic Names in November 2019.

See also

List of lakes in New Hampshire

References

Lakes of Belknap County, New Hampshire